Gerry Laffy (born 4 January 1960) is a British singer and guitarist who has played in the bands Girl, The London Cowboys, Sheer Greed, John Taylor, and Ultravox among others. Girl are still cited as an influence by many major artists twenty years later, even though they disbanded after only three years, allegedly due to their record company and mismanagement. In total Gerry Laffy has released 30 albums; he has played in venues as diverse as Wembley Arena, Taipei Hard Rock Cafe, the Reading Festival.

Musical career 
In 1978, Laffy was a founding member of the band Girl (along with Philip Lewis). Girl were first discovered by promoter Jon Lindsay, a partner of the former manager of The Who, Kit Lambert. Lambert and Lindsay were seeking out bands to sign to Lambert's new record company during the fledgling Nu Romantics era. The band were first introduced to music publisher Simon Napier-Bell of Nomis but eventually signed a recording deal with Jet Records. The band became famous after their now infamous three-night residency at the former Marquee Club in Wardour St. and recorded three albums and put out two (Sheer Greed and Wasted Youth) between 1980 and 1983. Killing Time was finally released in 1998, and two live albums and an anthology were released later. After Girl disintegrated, Laffy joined The London Cowboys, (with former members of The Idols, Sex Pistols and New York Dolls), which released two albums in 1985. He then played guitar on demos of Duran Duran's 1986 Notorious album. In 1990, Laffy founded GL Records and released the solo album Money & the Magic. The song "Shoot 'Em Down" from this album was included on the European soundtrack to the film Highlander II: The Quickening. Laffy formed Sheer Greed with some of Girl's alumni, which put out two albums in 1992 and 1993. He followed up with a joint Gerry Laffy/Simon Laffy album called Lying With Angels, then a guest appearance on the 1994 album Revelation from Ultravox. From mid-1997 to mid-2000, Laffy was lead guitarist in Terroristen, John Taylor's band while on hiatus from Duran Duran. Terroristen recorded constantly and gigged all over the United States and Japan, also travelling to Taiwan and Germany. In 2001, he released a second solo album All Day Long. In 2005, Gerry was a guest vocalist with ex-Freddie Mercury guitarist Chris Chesney on his album Diabolical Liberties. In 2007, a third solo album – The Icebox Studio Sessions was released. Self performed, written and produced. In July 2009 Girl were approached to reform for a 30th Anniversary tour of Japan & UK in 2010. It is yet to be confirmed. 2013 saw Gerry Laffy solo albums No.4. Entitled 'Just A Little Blurred'and 'Wrecked But Not Crushed' BOTH self performed, written and produced. 'Just A Little Blurred' features an update of the Girl classic 'My Number' with guest Craig Bundy on bass.

Other ventures

Film 
For fifteen years, from 1982 to 1997, Laffy worked as personal manager for film director Russell Mulcahy. They formed the company LeBad Films together. Laffy also served as Mulcahy's personal assistant on his first three features Razorback, Highlander, and Duran Duran's Arena. He managed Mulcahy through the pinnacle of his career, including ten feature films and dozens of award-winning music videos (including Duran Duran, Queen, The Rolling Stones, Billy Joel, Elton John and Fleetwood Mac) and commercials (including the Ford Motor Company, Smirnoff, Opel, British Petroleum, Universal Studios, and Miller Brewing). In 1995, he established his own film production company Laffy Michaels Filmworks, which set up John Carpenter's $20 million film Vampires, starring James Woods.

Art 
Before his first band, Laffy started his career as a graphic artist at London Weekend Television. Since 2001, he has come full circle and is now a London-based artist with an international celebrity clientele for his quirky, funky pop art/mixed media canvases.

Discography 

1980 – Girl: Sheer Greed
1982 – Girl: Wasted Youth
1998 – Girl: Killing Time (* finally released)
1999 – Girl: Live at the Marquee
1999 – Girl: Live at the Exposition Hall, Osaka, Japan
2002 – Girl: My Number: The Anthology
1985 – The London Cowboys: Dance Crazy
1985 – The London Cowboys: Live at the Milkweg Amsterdam
1990 – Gerry Laffy: Money & the Magic
1990 – Highlander II European Soundtrack: song: Gerry Laffy "Shoot 'Em Down" from Money & The Magic
1992 – Sheer Greed: Sublime to the Ridiculous
1993 – Sheer Greed: Live in London (re-released 2012 as a limited edition signed twin album run)
1994 – Gerry & Simon Laffy: Lying with Angels
1994 – Ultravox: Revelation (CD)
1997 – John Taylor, Feelings Are Good (CD)
1998 – John Taylor Terroristen, 5.30.98 (EP)
1998 – Roxy Music Tribute album: Dream Home Heartaches (CD)
1999 – John Taylor, Meltdown (recorded in 1992)
1999 – John Taylor, Juicy Jeans Promo Sampler (EP)
1999 – John Taylor, The Japan Album (CD)
2000 – John Taylor, Japanese (EP)
2000 – John Taylor, Live Cuts (CD)
2001 – John Taylor, Techno for Two (CD)
2001 – Gerry Laffy: All Day Long
2005 – Chris Chesney & Gerry Laffy – Diabolical Liberties
2006 – Girl – Live Bootlegs – Tokyo 1980
2006 – Girl – The Rare DVD Collection
2007 – Gerry Laffy – The Icebox Studio Sessions
2013 – Gerry Laffy – Just a Little Blurred +  Free promo Girl – Live at The Greyhound (London) 1982
2013 – Wrecked But Not Crushed + Free promo Girl Live at the Paris Theater (London) 1980
2016 – Girl: Sheer Greed – Rock Candy re-release
2016 – Girl: Wasted Youth – Rock Candy re-release
2019 – Girl Sheer Greed – Live in Osaka – Cherry Red Records box set
2019 – Wasted Youth – 6 CD's including Wasted Youth and live releases – Cherry Red Records

References 

English male singers
English rock guitarists
Girl (band) members
Living people
Sheer Greed members
1960 births
People from Hoxton
English male guitarists